Scythris falkovitshi is a moth species of the family Scythrididae. It was described by Kari Nupponen in 2009. It is found in Uzbekistan. The habitat consists of edges of saline deserts with halophytic vegetation.

Etymology
The species is dedicated to Dr. Mark I. Falkovitsh, a Russian lepidopterist who discovered several new taxa of Scythrididae from the deserts of Uzbekistan in the 1940s.

References

falkovitshi
Moths described in 2009
Moths of Asia